Sabuncupınar railway station is a railway station in the village of Sabuncupınar in the Kütahya Province. Sabuncupınar station consists of a side platform and a narrow island platform, with three tracks. TCDD Taşımacılık operates two daily intercity trains to İzmir and Denizli, as well as three daily regional trains to Tavşanlı, Kütahya and Afyonkarahisar.

References

External links
Sabuncupınar timetable
TCDD Taşımacılık

Railway stations in Kütahya Province